Katherine Gayle Raymont (born 31 October 1959) is an Australian former cricketer who played as a wicket-keeper and right-handed batter. She appeared in three Test matches and one One Day Internationals for Australia in 1990, all against New Zealand. She played domestic cricket for Queensland.

Raymont was the first woman from Queensland to play a One Day International for Australia.

References

External links
 
 
 Katherine Raymont at southernstars.org.au

Living people
1959 births
Sportswomen from Queensland
Australia women Test cricketers
Australia women One Day International cricketers
Queensland Fire cricketers